Cratenemertidae is a family of worms belonging to the order Hoplonemertea.

Genera:
 Achoronemertes Crandall & Gibson, 1998
 Cratenemertes Friedrich, 1955
 Korotkevitschia Friedrich, 1968
 Nipponemertes Friedrich, 1968
 Nipponnemertes Friedrich, 1968
 Valdivianemertes Stiasny-Wijnhoff, 1923

References

Monostilifera
Nemertea families